Walter Niedermayr  (born 27 February 1952) is an Italian photographer.

Niedermayr is mostly renowned for his photographs investigating the space as a reality occupied and shaped by people, questioning the ephemeral realms between representation and imagination. This body of work started in 1987 with the series Alpine Landschaften (Alpine Landscapes), and continued with Raumfolgen (Space Con / Sequences) (1991), Rohbauten (Shell Constructions) (1997) and Artefakte (Artifacts) (1992). His series Bildraum (Image-Space) (2001) focuses on architecture, space and environment. Between 2005 and 2008 he worked on the series Iran, while between 2009–2010 he has been working on The Aspen Series in Colorado. Between 2011 and 2014 Walter Niedermayr has been teaching Fine Art Photography at the Faculty of Design and Art, at the Free University of Bolzano/Bozen.

Selected solo exhibitions 
 2012: "Conjonctions", Istituto Italiano di Cultura de Paris, Paris
 2015: "Walter Niedermayr. Projection Spheres and Adventure Realms", Month of Photography, Bratislava
 2015: "Walter Niedermayr. Appearances", Ersel, Torino
 2017: "Walter Niedermayr", Galerie Johann Widauer, Innsbruck

Monographs 
 Die bleichen Berge. I monti pallidi., Ar/Ge Kunst, Bozen, and Raetia, 1994. 
 Reservate des Augenblicks. Momentary resorts., Editors Francesco Bonami, Siegrid Hauser, Ar/Ge Kunst, Bozen, and Hatje Cantz, Ostfildern 1998. 
 Remixed. Niedermayr, Pauhof, Hauser, text Moritz Küng, ar/ge Kunst Galerie Museum, Bolzano 1998. 
 Raumfolgen 1991–2001, texts by Martin Prinzhorn, Carl Aigner and Andrea Domesle, Eikon, Vienna, 2001. 
 Walter Niedermayr | Zivile Operationen, Kunsthalle Wien/Hatje Cantz, Ostfildern, 2003. 
 Walter Niedermayr | Titlis, Codax, Zürich 2004. 
 Walter Niedermayr | TAV, Linea di Confine, Rubiera/Schlebrügge, Vienna 2006. 
 Novartis Campus-Fabrikstrasse, 4, Sanaa/Sejima+Nishizawa: Works by Walter Niedermayr, text by Ulrike Jehle-Schulte, Architekturmuseum Basel/Merian, 2006. 
 Walter Niedermayr | Kazuyo Sejima + Ryue Nishizawa / Sanaa, Editor Moritz Küng, DeSingel, Antwerp/Hatje Cantz, Ostfildern 2007. 
 Station Z Sachsenhausen, Editors HG Merz + Walter Niedermayr, Publisher Hatje Cantz, Ostfildern 2009. 
 Walter Niedermayr | Recollection, Editors Amir Cheheltan and Lars Mextorf, Hatje Cantz, Ostfildern 2010. 
 Walter Niedermayr | Appearances, Editors Filippo Maggia and Francesca Lazzarini, Skira, Milan 2011. 
 Walter Niedermayr | Mose, Editor Tiziana Serena, Linea di Confine editore, Rubiera/Koenig Books, London 2011. 
 Walter Niedermayr – The Aspen Series, Texts by Chris Byrne, Catherine Grout, Paula Crown, Hatje Cantz, Ostfildern 2013, .
  Walter Niedermayr | Raumaneignungen. Lech 2015–2016, Text by Catherine Grout and a conversation between Gerold and Katia Schneider, Walter Niedermayr and Arno Ritter, Ostfildern 2016, .

References

External links 

Italian photographers
Italian contemporary artists
Artists from Bolzano
Living people
1952 births
Germanophone Italian people